La califfa (English: Lady Caliph) is a 1970 Franco-Italian social drama film written and directed by Alberto Bevilacqua. It was entered into the 1971 Cannes Film Festival.

Plot
In the Emilia province of Italy, out of solidarity with the workers fired from another failed company, the workers occupy the factory of self-made industrialist Annibale Doberdò. In dealing with the situation, he starts negotiations. An employee, the beautiful and fiery Irene, nicknamed Califfa, whose worker-husband was killed during a demonstration, meets with Doberdò. He wants to induce the strikers back to work and they show uncertainty between the directives of their union and the incitements to violence by extremists. Irene becomes Doberdò's lover and asks the workers to listen to the industrialist's proposals for renewal of working terms and worker participation in the factory management. The riots, however, continue. The industrialist's stance is badly received by other employers. While he returns from yet another meeting with his lover, Doberdò is killed by assassins.

Cast
 Ugo Tognazzi - Annibale Doberdò, industrialist
 Romy Schneider - Irene "La Califfa" Corsini, worker
 Massimo Farinelli - Giampiero Doberdò, son of Annibale 
 Marina Berti - Clementine Doberdò, wife of Annibale
 Guido Alberti - Catholic priest
 Roberto Bisacco - Bisacco
 Gigi Ballista - major industrialist
 Massimo Serato - failed industrialist
 Eva Brun - wife of failed industrialist
 Luigi Casellato - police commissioner
 Gigi Reder - servant
 Ernesto Colli - worker
 Enzo Fiermonte - union activist

Music
The film's music was composed by Ennio Morricone.

References

External links

1970 films
1970 drama films
1970s Italian-language films
Films directed by Alberto Bevilacqua
Films set in Emilia-Romagna
Films about the labor movement
Films scored by Ennio Morricone
1970 directorial debut films
Italian drama films
1970s Italian films